Elvis Gashi (born December 12, 1992) is a Kosovan-American kickboxer currently signed with Glory, where he is the former Lightweight title challenger.

Kickboxing career

Early career
Gashi made his professional debut against Jeremy Carper at CSC 39. He won the fight by a first-round knockout. He would go on to win his next his next six fights, defeating Andre Shuler twice, Ben Peak, Eric Olsen and Michael Stevens by stoppage, and Chris Lukusa by decision.

Glory
Gashi made his promotional debut against Josh Jauncey at Glory 43: New York. He beat Jauncey by a third-round TKO. He was next scheduled to fight Nate Richardson at Glory 48: New York, and won the fight by unanimous decision. Gashi would go on to string together three more victories, defeating William Goldie-Galloway and Nick Chasteen by decision, as well as Justin Houghton by a first round knockout.

Gashi's five fight winning streak earned him the chance to challenge to Lightweight kingpin Marat Grigorian at Glory 73. Grigorian won the fight in the fifth round, by way of knockout.

Gashi was scheduled to fight Tyjani Beztati at Glory 78: Arnhem for the vacant Glory Lightweight Championship. He lost the fight by unanimous decision.

Titles and accomplishments

Amateur
 4x Kosovo National champion
 IKF USA Champion

Professional
Glory upset of the year 2017
Fastest knockout in Glory kickboxing lightweight history (23 sec)

Kickboxing record

|- style="background:#fbb;"
| 2021-09-04 || Loss||align=left| Tyjani Beztati || Glory 78: Rotterdam || Rotterdam, Netherlands || Decision (Unanimous) || 5 || 3:00
|-
! style=background:white colspan=9 |
|-  style="background:#FFBBBB;"
| 2019-12-07|| Loss||align=left| Marat Grigorian || Glory 73: Shenzhen || Shenzhen, China || KO (Punches) || 5 || 2:03 
|-
! style=background:white colspan=9 |
|-  style="background:#cfc;"
| 2019-07-05|| Win ||align=left| Justin Houghton || Glory 67: Orlando || Orlando, United States || KO (Body kick) || 1 || 0:23
|-  style="background:#cfc;"
| 2018-07-20|| Win ||align=left| Nick Chasteen || Glory 55: New York || New York City, New York, USA || Decision (Unanimous)|| 3 || 3:00
|-  style="background:#cfc;"
| 2018-06-02|| Win ||align=left| William Goldie-Galloway || Glory 54: Birmingham || Birmingham, United Kingdom || Decision (Unanimous) || 3 || 3:00
|-  style="background:#cfc;"
| 2017-12-01 || Win ||align=left| Nate Richardson || Glory 48: New York || New York City, New York, USA || Decision (Unanimous) || 3 || 3:00
|-  style="background:#cfc;"
| 2017-07-14 || Win ||align=left| Josh Jauncey || Glory 43: New York || New York City, New York, USA || TKO (Referee Stoppage/Punches) || 2 || 2:59
|-  style="background:#cfc;"
| 2017-03-03 || Win ||align=left| Chris Lukusa || Friday Night Fights || United States || Decision || 3 || 3:00
|-  style="background:#cfc;"
| 2016-10-14 || Win ||align=left| Michael Stevens || Friday Night Fights || United States || TKO (Punches) || 3 || 2:15
|-  style="background:#cfc;"
| 2016-08-19 || Win ||align=left| Andre Shuler || Friday Night Fights || United States || KO || 1 || 2:49
|-  style="background:#cfc;"
| 2015-12-11 || Win ||align=left| Eric Olsen || Friday Night Fights || United States || KO || 1 ||
|-  style="background:#cfc;"
| 2015-07-17 || Win ||align=left| Ben Peak || Combat Zone 54 || United States || TKO (Doctor Stoppage) || 1 || 1:36
|-  style="background:#cfc;"
| 2014-06-13 || Win ||align=left| Mike Santiago || Combat at the Capitale 33 || New York City, New York, USA || TKO (Referee stoppage) || 1 || 1:51
|-  style="background:#cfc;"
| 2014-04-04 || Win ||align=left| Andre Shuler || Combat At The Capitale 32 || New York City, New York, USA || KO (Right hook) || 1 || 1:51
|-  style="background:#cfc;"
| 2014-03-22 || Win ||align=left| Jeremy Carper || Combat Sports Challenge 39 || Richmond, Virginia, United States || TKO || 2 || 1:09 
|-
| colspan=9 | Legend:

See also
 List of male kickboxers

References

1992 births
Living people
Lightweight kickboxers
Glory kickboxers
Sportspeople from Peja
Kosovan male kickboxers
American male kickboxers